The 2015 AFL women's draft was an opportunity for Melbourne and the Western Bulldogs to select players for the Hampson-Hardeman Cup. It consisted of a draft before the first match, held on 20 April and including 34 picks, and a mini-draft before the second match, held on 22 July and including 10 picks. Before the first match, teams were permitted to retain six players from their 2013 squads, and completed their lists through the draft. Coastal Titans ruck Emma King was selected by the Bulldogs with the first pick.

Draft

Mini-draft

Retained players

Before the first match, six players were selected to be retained by each team, barring unavailability.

Melbourne

 Kirby Bentley
 Kara Donnellan
 Tayla Harris
 Melissa Hickey
 Daisy Pearce
 Chelsea Randall

Western Bulldogs

 Katie Brennan
 Steph Chiocci
 Moana Hope
 Emma Kearney
 Aasta O'Connor
 Darcy Vescio

References

AFL women's draft
ADL women's draft
AFL women's draft
AFL women's draft
2010s in Melbourne
Australian rules football in Victoria (Australia)
Sport in Melbourne
Events in Melbourne